Once a Jolly Swagman is a 1949 British film starring Dirk Bogarde, Bonar Colleano, Bill Owen, Thora Hird and Sid James. It is centred on the sport of motorcycle speedway racing, which was at its peak of popularity at the time. It was released in the U.S. as Maniacs on Wheels.
The film is based on the 1946 novel by Montagu Slater.

The title of the film refers to the first line of the Australian song "Waltzing Matilda".

Director Jack Lee later said he enjoyed making the film "because it was physical, there was action and I had good actors."

Cast

Bill Fox - 	Dirk Bogarde
Tommy Possey - 	Bonar Colleano
Pat Gibbon - 	Renée Asherson
Lag Gibbon - 	Bill Owen
Dorothy 'Dotty' Liz - 	Moira Lister
Ma Fox	- Thora Hird
Duggie Lewis - 	Cyril Cusack
Rowton - 	Sidney James
Pa Fox - 	James Hayter
Dick Fox - 	Patric Doonan
Mr Pusey - 	Russell Waters
Taffy - 	Dudley Jones
Derek Blake - 	Anthony Oliver
Mrs Lewis - 	Pauline Jameson
Kay Fox - 	Sandra Dorne
Christopher Yates - 	Stuart Lindsell
Chick	- Frederick Knight
Solicitor - 	Michael Kent
Jimmy, the Reporter - 	Cyril Chamberlain
WAAF Flight Sergeant - 	June Bardsley

References

External links

Review of film at Variety

1949 films
1949 drama films
British auto racing films
Films based on British novels
Films set in London
Films shot at Pinewood Studios
British drama films
Motorcycle racing films
Films produced by Ian Dalrymple
British black-and-white films
1940s English-language films
1940s British films